Imri Ziv (born 12 September 1991), also known as IMRI, is an Israeli singer and voice actor. After winning HaKokhav HaBa, he represented Israel in the Eurovision Song Contest 2017 in Kyiv with the song "I Feel Alive" placing in the 23rd place in the finals.

Life and career

Life and education
Born in Hod HaSharon, in Israel, to a family of Ashkenazi Jewish (Romanian-Jewish, Polish-Jewish, Austrian-Jewish, and Russian-Jewish) descent. Ziv studied at Ilan Ramon High School. While doing his obligatory military service, he practiced in a musical band of the Education and Youth Corps Unit of the Israel Defense Forces. For university, he studied a degree in communication sciences at the Interdisciplinary Center in Herzliya.

Imri says that since he was a child he has had a talent for easily learning languages. He speaks fluent Spanish with an Argentinian accent, as his Spanish teacher was from Buenos Aires.

2012–2016: The Voice Israel and early career

In 2012, he auditioned for the inaugural edition of the television talent show The Voice Israel, singing "אהובתי" with 2 judges of four, Sarit Hadad and Rami Kleinstein turning their chairs. Being part of Team Rami, he proceeded to the Battle Rounds singing "פרפרים" and was eliminated by mentor Kleinstein who opted for advancing teammate rival Orit Shalom.

Ziv performed as a backing vocalist in Israel's Eurovision Song Contest 2015 and 2016 entries, respectively with Nadav Guedj singing "Golden Boy" and Hovi Star singing "Made of Stars" with both qualifying to the finals.

In 2016, he performed voice over in Hebrew for the 3D animated film Trolls.

2017–present: HaKokhav HaBa and Eurovision Song Contest 2017
He participated in season 4 of HaKokhav HaBa L'Eurovizion, the reality singing competition "The Next Star for Eurovision", being the Israeli format of Rising Star. In the auditions on 2 and 3 January 2017, he performed "The Edge of Glory" by Lady Gaga, obtained 93% of the public vote and the approval of all judges Keren Peles, Harel Skaat (2010 Israeli Eurovision entrant) and duo Static & Ben-El Tavori.

In the quarter-finals held on 30 and 31 January 2017, he performed "Rude Boy" (Video: Imri Ziv performs Rude Boy on YouTube) by Rihanna earning 72% and approval from three judges and in the semi-final "I Don't Want to Miss a Thing" by Aerosmith earning 95% and approval of all judges and qualifying for the finals.

In the final on 13 February 2017, he first performed "Halo" by Beyoncé winning 78% of the public's votes and approval of all four judges. He followed it up with an interpretation of "Because of You" by Kelly Clarkson winning the contest with 74% approval rating. The finalist Diana Golbi finished runner-up with 67% and Julieta was third with 58%.

After winning HaKokhav HaBa L'Eurovizion, Ziv represented Israel at the Eurovision Song Contest 2017. His song, "I Feel Alive", written by Dolev Ram and Penn Hazut was released on 9 March 2017, placing third in the second semi-final and 23rd in the final

Discography

Singles

See also
Music of Israel

References

External links 
Facebook
YouTube

21st-century Israeli male singers
Israeli pop singers
Living people
Eurovision Song Contest entrants for Israel
Eurovision Song Contest entrants of 2017
1991 births
People from Hod HaSharon
The Voice (franchise) contestants
Israeli Ashkenazi Jews